The siege of La Rochelle (or sometimes ) was a result of a war between the French royal forces of Louis XIII of France and the Huguenots of La Rochelle in 1627–28. The siege marked the height of the struggle between the Catholics and the Protestants in France, and ended with a complete victory for King Louis XIII and the Catholics.

Background

The 1598 Edict of Nantes that ended the French Wars of Religion granted Protestants, commonly known as Huguenots, a large degree of autonomy and self-rule. La Rochelle was the centre of Huguenot seapower, and a key point of resistance against the Catholic royal government.

The assassination of Henry IV of France in 1610 led to the appointment of Marie de' Medici as regent for her nine-year-old son, Louis XIII. Her removal in 1617 caused a series of revolts by powerful regional nobles, both Catholic and Protestant, while religious tensions were heightened by the outbreak of the 1618 to 1648 Thirty Years War. In 1621, Louis re-established Catholicism in the formerly Huguenot region of Béarn, resulting in an uprising led by Henri de Rohan and his brother Soubise.

Despite the Royalist capture of Saint-Jean d'Angély, a blockade of La Rochelle was unsuccessful and the revolt ended in stalemate with the October 1622 Treaty of Montpellier. Taking La Rochelle was a priority for Louis and his chief minister Cardinal Richelieu; it was then the second- or third-largest city in France, with over 30,000 inhabitants, and one of its most important ports. In addition to the customs duties generated by imports, it was also among the biggest producers of salt, a major source of taxes for the state; this made it economically crucial.

Defeating Rohan and taking possession of La Rochelle were both essential for Richelieu's policy of centralisation, but since the French Crown did not have a navy strong enough to capture it, he asked England for help. When James I refused, he approached the Dutch Republic. The Huguenots were supported by Spain, who the Protestant Dutch were then fighting for their independence; in return for French subsidies, the Dutch agreed to provide naval backing in the 1624 Treaty of Compiègne.

English intervention

The Anglo-French conflict followed the failure of their alliance of 1624, in which England had tried to find an ally in France against the power of the Habsburgs. In 1626, France under Richelieu concluded a secret peace with Spain, and disputes arose around Henrietta Maria's household. Furthermore, France was building the power of its navy, leading the English to be convinced that France must be opposed "for reasons of state".

In June 1626, Walter Montagu was sent to France to contact dissident noblemen, and from March 1627 attempted to organize a French rebellion. The plan was to send an English fleet to encourage rebellion, triggering a new Huguenot revolt by Duke Henri de Rohan and his brother Soubise.

First La Rochelle expedition

On the first expedition, King Charles I sent a fleet of over 100 ships, under his favourite George Villiers, 1st Duke of Buckingham, to encourage a major rebellion in La Rochelle. In June 1627, Buckingham organised a landing on the nearby island of Île de Ré with 6,000 men in order to help the Huguenots, thus starting the Anglo-French War of 1627, with the objectives being to control the approaches to La Rochelle and to encourage the rebellion in the city.

The city of La Rochelle initially refused to declare itself an ally of Buckingham against the crown of France and effectively denied access to its harbour to Buckingham's fleet. An open alliance would be declared only in September, during the first fights between La Rochelle and royal troops.

Although it was a Protestant stronghold, Île de Ré had not directly joined the rebellion against the king. On Île de Ré, the English under Buckingham tried to take the fortified city of Saint-Martin in the siege of Saint-Martin-de-Ré (1627) but were repulsed after three months. Small French royal boats managed to supply St Martin in spite of the English blockade. Buckingham ultimately ran out of money and support, and his army was weakened by disease. After a last attack on Saint-Martin, they were repulsed with heavy casualties and left with their ships.

Siege

Meanwhile, in August 1627 French royal forces started to surround La Rochelle, with an army of 7,000 soldiers, 600 horses, and 24 cannons, led by Charles of Angoulême. They started to reinforce fortifications at Bongraine (modern Les Minimes), and at the Fort Louis.

On September 10, the first cannon shots were fired by La Rochelle against royal troops at Fort Louis, starting the third Huguenot rebellion. La Rochelle was the greatest stronghold among the Huguenot cities of France, and the centre of Huguenot resistance. Cardinal Richelieu acted as commander of the besiegers when the King was absent.

The surrounding fortifications were completed in April 1628, manned with an army of 30,000.

The initial idea for blocking the channel came from the Italian engineer Pompeo Targone, but his structure was broken by winter weather, before the idea was taken up by the royal architect Clément Métezeau in November 1627. The wall was built on a foundation of sunken hulks filled with rubble. French artillery battered English ships trying to supply the city.

Meanwhile, in southern France, Henri de Rohan vainly attempted to raise a rebellion to relieve La Rochelle. Until February, some ships were able to go through the seawall under construction, but after March this became impossible. The city was completely blockaded, with the only hope coming from possible intervention by an English fleet.

Foreign support for the French Crown

Dutch support
The Roman Catholic government of France rented ships from the Protestant city of Amsterdam to conquer the Protestant city of La Rochelle. This resulted in a debate in the city council of Amsterdam as to whether the French soldiers should be allowed to have a Roman Catholic sermon on board of the Protestant Dutch ships. The result of the debate was that it was not allowed. The Dutch ships transported the French soldiers to La Rochelle. France was a Dutch ally in the war against the Habsburgs.

Spanish alliance
In the occasion of the siege of La Rochelle, Spain manoeuvered towards the formation of a Franco-Spanish alliance against the common enemies that were the English, the Huguenots, and the Dutch. Richelieu accepted Spanish help, and a Spanish fleet of 30 to 40 warships was sent from Cadiz to the Gulf of Morbihan as an affirmation of strategic support, arriving three weeks after the departure of Buckingham from Île de Ré. At one point, the Spanish fleet anchored in front of La Rochelle, but did not engage in actual operations against the city.

English relief efforts
England attempted to send two more fleets to relieve La Rochelle.

Second La Rochelle expedition
A naval force led by William Feilding, Earl of Denbigh, left in April 1628, but returned without a fight to Portsmouth, as Denbigh said that he had no commission to hazard the king's ships in a fight, and returned shamefully to Portsmouth.

Third La Rochelle expedition
A third fleet was dispatched under the Admiral of the Fleet, the Earl of Lindsey in August 1628, consisting of 29 warships and 31 merchantmen.
In September 1628, the English fleet tried to relieve the city. After bombarding French positions and failing to force the sea wall, the English fleet had to withdraw. Following this last disappointment, the city surrendered on 28 October 1628.

Epilogue

Residents of La Rochelle had resisted for 14 months, under the leadership of the mayor Jean Guitton and with gradually diminishing help from England. During the siege, the population of La Rochelle decreased from 27,000 to 5,000 due to casualties, famine, and disease.

Surrender was unconditional. By the terms of the Peace of Alais, the Huguenots lost their territorial, political, and military rights, but retained the religious freedom granted by the Edict of Nantes. However, they were left at the mercy of the monarchy, unable to resist later when Louis XIV abolished the Edict of Nantes altogether and embarked on active persecution.

Aside from its religious aspect, the siege of La Rochelle marks an important success in the creation of a strong central government of France, in control throughout its territory and able to suppress regional defiance. In the immediate aftermath was the growth of the absolute monarchy, but it had long-term effects upon all later French regimes up to the present.

The French philosopher Descartes is known to have visited the scene of the siege in 1627.

The siege was depicted in detail by numerous artists such as Jacques Callot and marked by the 1635 painting Louis XIII Crowned by Victory.

Birdeye views by Jacques Callot

Maps by Jacques Callot

Others

Numismatics
Around the time of the siege, a series of propaganda coins were cast to describe the stakes of the siege, and then commemorate the Royal victory. These coins depict the siege in symbolic ways, showing the city and the English effort in a poor light, while putting an advantageous light on Royal might.

In popular culture
The siege forms the historical background for the novel The Three Musketeers by Alexandre Dumas, père and the book's numerous adaptations to stage, screen, comics and video game.

The 11th book of Robert Merle's Fortune de France series, La Gloire et les perils, deals entirely with the siege.

In Lawrence Norfolk's 1991 novel, Lemprière's Dictionary, the siege is the central cause of events (entirely fictional) 160 years later in London around the writing of John Lemprière's Classical Dictionary containing a full Account of all the Proper Names mentioned in Ancient Authors.

Taylor Caldwell writes about the siege in great detail in her 1943 novel The Arm and the Darkness but has as its commander the fictional Huguenot nobleman Arsene de Richepin, one of the central characters of the book.

References

Sources
 
 
 
 
 
 

Huguenot rebellions
Conflicts in 1627
Conflicts in 1628
La Rochelle
1627 in France
1628 in France
La Rochelle 1627
History of Charente-Maritime
La Rochelle
Battles of the Thirty Years' War
England–France relations
Cardinal Richelieu
Louis XIII
Anglo-French War (1627–1629)